The pectinate muscles (musculi pectinati) are parallel muscular ridges in the walls of the atria of the heart.

Structure 
Behind the crest (crista terminalis) of the right atrium the internal surface is smooth. Pectinate muscles make up the part of the wall in front of this, the right atrial appendage.

In the left atrium, the pectinate muscles are confined to the inner surface of its atrial appendage. They tend to be fewer and smaller than in the right atrium. This is due to the embryological origin of the auricles, which are the true atria. Some sources cite that the pectinate muscles are useful in increasing the power of contraction without increasing heart mass substantially.

Pectinate muscles of the atria are different from the trabeculae carneae, which are found on the inner walls of both ventricles. The pectinate muscles originate from the crista terminalis.

Name 
The pectinate muscles are so-called because of their resemblance to the teeth of a comb, as in pecten.

References

External links
 
 
  - "Right atrium, internal structure, anterior view"

Cardiac anatomy